Sverige is a Swedish 12 Metre class yacht. It was by designed by Pelle Petterson and built by Enoch & Elfstedt.

Sverige competed in the 1977 Herbert Pell Cup and the 1980 Herbert Pell Cup, helmed by Pelle Petterson. Both times it was beaten by Australia.

References

12-metre class yachts
Sailing yachts built in Sweden
Sailing yachts designed by Pelle Pettersson
1970s sailing yachts
Sailing yachts of Sweden
Louis Vuitton Cup yachts
1977 ships